The 2009–10 NBB Cup was the 42nd season of the Dutch NBB Cup. The championship game was played on 24 March 2013 in the Topsportcentrum in Almere. ZZ Leiden won the final from ABC Amsterdam, winning its second national cup title. Danny Gibson was the top scorer in the final with 20 points. Leiden head coach Toon van Helfteren won his first NBB Cup title as a coach.

Fourth round

|}

Quarterfinals

|}

Final Four

Bracket

References

NBB Cup
NBB Cup